Audio magazine may refer to:

 Audio (1947-2000), an American magazine about audio developments and products
 A regularly published series of podcasts obtained by subscription

See also
 :Category:Audio periodicals